Leonardo S.p.A., formerly Leonardo-Finmeccanica and originally Finmeccanica, is an Italian multinational company specialising in aerospace, defence and security. Headquartered in Rome, Italy, the company has 180 sites worldwide. It is the eighth largest defence contractor in the world based on 2018 revenues. The company is partially owned by the Italian government, which holds 30.2% of the company's shares and is its largest shareholder.

On 1 January 2016, Leonardo-Finmeccanica became a single industrial company by integrating the activities of its subsidiaries AgustaWestland, Alenia Aermacchi, DRS Technologies, Selex ES, Oto Melara and WASS. The company is organised into five divisions (Helicopters, Aircraft, Aerostructures, Electronics, Cybersecurity). It is also the parent company and corporate centre for the subsidiaries and joint ventures Telespazio, Thales Alenia Space, MBDA and ATR. Leonardo is listed on the Borsa Italiana and is a constituent of the FTSE MIB and Dow Jones Sustainability Indices. , the company was known by the transitional name of Leonardo-Finmeccanica as part of the restructuring process of the company carried out by CEO Mauro Moretti from the beginning of his mandate in 2014. The company changed its name to Leonardo S.p.A. on 1 January 2017, after the Italian inventor Leonardo da Vinci.

History

Foundation

Società Finanziaria Meccanica, "Finmeccanica", was established in 1948 as the mechanical engineering subholding of the state-owned Istituto per la Ricostruzione Industriale (IRI). Finmeccanica has held for years some historic Italian enterprises, as Alfa Romeo (automobiles), Aeritalia (aerospace) and Ansaldo (engineering). From the 1960s to the 1980s Italy's defence and aerospace industry was split into state-holding entities:  owned the helicopters manufacturer Agusta, the defence company Oto Melara and the electronic enterprise Officine Galileo, whereas STET (another IRI subsidiary) held Selenia, Elsag and SGS Thomson, all electronic enterprises with specializations in security and defense. In 1989 an internal IRI reorganization process brought STET electronic enterprises to Finmeccanica, and the Aeritalia-Selenia merger constituted its aerospace subsidiary Alenia.

1990s
In 1992 EFIM was wound up because of its troubled financial situation; and Agusta, Oto Melara, Officine Galileo and Breda passed to Finmeccanica, which became one of the main Italian industrial groups. Finmeccanica, which was previously fully state owned by IRI, became partly privatized in 1993, when it was listed in the Milan Borsa Italiana stock exchange.

In 1992 Finmeccanica's Agusta became a 32% partner in NHIndustries, the prime contractor for the NH90 helicopter, along with Eurocopter (62.5%) and Fokker (5.5%).

2000s

In July 2000 Finmeccanica and the British GKN agreed to merge their respective helicopter subsidiaries (Agusta and GKN-Westland Helicopters) to form AgustaWestland. In December 2001 the missile business of Alenia Marconi Systems (AMS), a joint Finmeccanica/BAE Systems company, was merged with other European missile manufacturers to form MBDA which thus became the world's second largest missile manufacturer. In July 2003 Finmeccanica and BAE Systems announced their intention to set up three joint venture companies, to be collectively known as Eurosystems. These companies would have pooled the avionics, C4ISTAR and communications businesses of the two companies. In March 2007 BAE Systems sold its 25% share to Finmeccanica for €400 million. In January 2013 the company merged with Finmeccanica's other defence electronics companies, SELEX Elsag and SELEX Sistemi Integrati, to become Selex ES. In May 2008 Finmeccanica announced its intention to purchase the U.S. defense contractor DRS Technologies for nearly $5.2 billion. On 22 October 2008 the sale of DRS Technologies was finalized.

2010s

During 2011–2013, Finmeccanica emails were published by WikiLeaks and Finmeccanica was subject to judicial inquiries on several fronts and management changes.

According to Finmeccanica emails published in the Syria Files release by WikiLeaks on 5 July 2012, Finmeccanica increased its sale of mobile communications equipment to Syrian authorities during 2011, delivering 500 of these to the Damascus suburb Muadamia in May 2011, after the Syrian uprising had started, and sending engineers to Damascus in February 2012 to provide training in using the communications equipment in helicopter terminals, while the uprising continued. Finmeccanica stated that the equipment sales were legal, they occurred "before the outbreak of conflict inside Syria", and the equipment "was designed for use by emergency responders" for civilian use only.

On 12 February 2013, the chief executive, Giuseppe Orsi, was arrested on corruption charges. Prosecutors alleged that he paid bribes to ensure the sale of 12 helicopters to the Indian government, when he was head of the group's AgustaWestland unit.

In July 2013, the Letta government appointed former police chief Giovanni De Gennaro as Chairman of Finmeccanica. In December 2013 Finmeccanica sold 39.55% of its share capital in Ansaldo Energia to Fondo Strategico Italiano. The remaining 15% of Finmeccanica's share will be sold by 31 December 2017.

In the first half of 2014, Finmeccanica's new Chief Executive Officer and General Manager Mauro Moretti started a significant process of change for the Group, both in terms of strategic choices and organizational structure. The goal was to create a more cohesive and efficient group in which all processes (research, marketing and sales, engineering, procurement, strategies and governance) are centralized and integrated and can interact each other. This encompasses the 100% owned companies of the core aerospace and defence business (AgustaWestland, Alenia Aermacchi, Oto Melara, Selex ES and WASS) being transformed into seven new Finmeccanica divisions. The current holding company will then become an operating company based on seven major business areas, maintaining its parent company and corporate centre function for the Group companies excluded from the model (DRS Technologies, Telespazio, Thales Alenia Space, MBDA and ATR).

At the end of 2014, Finmeccanica transferred its stake in BredaMenarinibus to the newco Industria Italiana Autobus (20% Finmeccanica and 80% King Long), thereby taking a further step in the Group's portfolio rationalization process.

In 2015, Hitachi signed a binding agreement with Finmeccanica for Hitachi's acquisition of the AnsaldoBreda business, excluding some revamping activities and residual contracts, and of the entire Finmeccanica stake in the share capital of Ansaldo STS, approximately 40% of the total capital.

FATA, another subsidiary of the Finmeccanica Group since 2004 that was not part of the core business, was sold in 2015 to the Gruppo Danieli, dealing in the production of steel plants.

On 1 January 2016, Finmeccanica become a single integrated industrial entity that have absorbed the activities of AgustaWestland, Alenia Aermacchi, Selex ES, OTO Melara and WASS.

From Finmeccanica to Leonardo 
A company rebranding operation led by Mauro Moretti began in March 2016, with a proposal to change the company name. From 1 January 2017 Finmeccanica officially became Leonardo, a name inspired by the Italian savant Leonardo da Vinci.  On 18 March 2017 the Italian Treasury proposed that the veteran banker Alessandro Profumo replace Mauro Moretti as CEO of Leonardo, and on 16 May the Board appointed Alessandro Profumo to the role.

Organization

 Aeronautics

 Leonardo designs, develops, produces, maintains and upgrades commercial, military and military training aircraft, as well as producing aerostructures. The company is part of a network of joint ventures and product partnerships, including such programmes as Eurofighter (with BAE Systems and Airbus Group) to build the supersonic multi-role Typhoon and ATR (with Airbus Group) to build the family of turboprop regional aircraft of the same name.

 Helicopters

 Leonardo is active in the helicopter market, managing: development to production, pilot training and after sales support. Leonardo produces a range of helicopters for the commercial and defence markets, including all the main weight categories, from 1.8-tonne single-engined to 16-tonne three-engined helicopters.
The company launched its VIP helicopters and travel services under a related new name "Agusta" and unveiled the heliport called "Casa Agusta" at a formal ceremony at the Expo 2020 in Dubai.

 Defence Electronics & Security

 Leonardo develops and integrates systems for the air and sea traffic management and the control and protection of land and sea borders; it also develops secure communications networks and solutions for the management of infrastructure and systems. The services include the design and management of IT infrastructure and data processing for intelligence and cyber security. Leonardo is active in the design, development and production of naval artillery, armoured vehicles and underwater systems. In the Defence Electronics & Security sector, Leonardo operates through its US subsidiary DRS Technologies and the joint venture MBDA (37.5% BAE Systems, 37.5% Airbus Group and 25% Leonardo) that produces missiles and missile systems.

 Space

 In the space sector, Leonardo is active mainly through joint ventures Telespazio (Leonardo 67% - Thales 33%) and Thales Alenia Space (Leonardo 33% - Thales 67%). Telespazio offers a wide range of skills and services from design and development of space systems, launch services management and in-orbit satellites to Earth observation services, integrated communications and satellite navigation and localisation. Thales Alenia Space is engaged in the design, integration, testing and implementation of space systems, for navigation, telecommunications, meteorology, environmental control, defence, scientific missions and Earth observation.

Areas of business 

Leonardo is present worldwide in about 20 countries (42% in Italy and 58% abroad). Commercially,  there are about 150 countries in the world that use products, systems and services supplied by Leonardo.

Its production activities and its main industrial and commercial bases are located in Italy, the United Kingdom, Poland and the United States. Moreover, Leonardo has gained a significant presence in France and Germany, and is a partner for various international industrial collaborations.
The company is an ITER supplier.

In December 2021, Leonardo Electronics announced it would be building a semiconductor device fabrication facility in Oro Valley, Arizona with construction beginning in the first half of 2022.

Subsidiaries
 100% Leonardo DRS
 100% AgustaWestland NV
 100% Finmeccanica do Brasil LTDA
 100% Finmeccanica Finance SA
 100% Finmeccanica Global Services SpA
 100% Finmeccanica North America Inc.
 100% Finmeccanica UK Ltd.
 100% Meccanica Holdings USA Inc.
 100% So.Ge.Pa.
 100% Vitrociset

Joint ventures 
 21% Eurofighter GmbH
 25% MBDA
 28% Avio SpA
 33% Thales Alenia Space SAS
 67% Telespazio SpA
 50% Bradley Collier
 14% BCV Investments SCA
 31% Elettronica SpA
 50% Eurosysnav SAS
 11% Eurotech SpA
 31% Ind. A.E.M.R. Piaggio SpA
 25% Libyan-Italian Advanced Tech Co.

Others

 25.1% Hensoldt
 10% Atitech SPA·
 20% IIA - Industria Italiana Autobus SPA·
 14% ITP SRL

Shareholder structure
As of February 2022, Leonardo's largest shareholder was the Italian Ministry of Economy and Finances with 30.20%.

Key budget items  (2007–2022)

 * Restated figures due to the adoption of IFRS 11, which resulted in the deconsolidation of the joint ventures' group.
 **Restated figures as a result of the reclassification of the transport sector as a discontinued operation.

Source:

See also 
 
 
 International Flight Training School

References

External links

 

 
Conglomerate companies of Italy
Aerospace companies of Italy
Defence companies of Italy
Engineering companies of Italy
Firearm manufacturers of Italy
Military vehicle manufacturers
Multinational companies headquartered in Italy
Conglomerate companies established in 1948
Manufacturing companies established in 1948
Technology companies established in 1948
Vehicle manufacturing companies established in 1948
Italian companies established in 1948
Government-owned companies of Italy
Partly privatized companies of Italy
Italian brands